Phyo Pyae Sone is a Burmese pop singer. He debuted after winning the 2010 season of Melody World, a local singing competition. His first album, Every Hope (မျှော်နိုင်သမျှ) was released in 2015. In 2018, he collaborated with Aung Htet to release another album, Star (ကြယ်).

Early life and education
He is a physician by training, having attended University of Medicine 1, Yangon.

Personal life
On 7 October 2019, Phyo and two others, Nyein Chan Ko, and Ronny San Lwin, were falsely arrested on charges of drug possession. They were subsequently released on 9 October 2019, after police authorities determined they had been falsely arrested.

Discography

Every Hope (မျှော်နိုင်သမျှ) (2015)
With Many Loves (အချစ်များစွာနဲ့) (2017)
Thingyan Lay Nyin Lu Lin (သင်္ကြန်လေညင်းလုလင်) (2018)
Star (ကြယ်) (2018)

References

External links
 
 

Living people
21st-century Burmese male singers
21st-century Burmese physicians
University of Medicine 1, Yangon alumni
Melody World participants
Year of birth missing (living people)